Top Chef: New York is the fifth season of the American reality television series Top Chef. It was first filmed in New York City, New York, before concluding in New Orleans, Louisiana. The season premiered on Bravo on November 12, 2008, and ended on March 4, 2009. In the season finale, Hosea Rosenberg was declared the winner over runners-up Stefan Richter and Carla Hall. Fabio Viviani was voted Fan Favorite.

Contestants
Seventeen chefs were selected to compete in Top Chef: New York.

Carla Hall, Fabio Viviani, and Jamie Lauren returned to compete in Top Chef: All-Stars. Stefan Richter returned for Top Chef: Seattle, and later competed in Top Chef Duels.

Contestant progress

: The chef(s) did not receive immunity for winning the Quickfire Challenge.
: Lauren was eliminated by placing last in the Quickfire Challenge.
: Due to a refrigerator malfunction which spoiled some of the chefs' ingredients during the Elimination Challenge, no one was eliminated. Consequently, two chefs were eliminated in the following episode.
: Leah, Jamie, and Jeff (the three most recently eliminated contestants) were brought back to the competition to compete in a Quickfire Challenge. The winner would compete in the subsequent Elimination Challenge, but could only move on to the season finale if they won the challenge. Jeff won the Quickfire, and the judges picked him as one of their favorites in the Elimination Challenge, but did not select him to win. Consequently, he was automatically eliminated.
 (WINNER) The chef won the season and was crowned "Top Chef".
 (RUNNER-UP) The chef was a runner-up for the season.
 (WIN) The chef won the Elimination Challenge.
 (HIGH) The chef was selected as one of the top entries in the Elimination Challenge, but did not win.
 (IN) The chef was not selected as one of the top or bottom entries in the Elimination Challenge and was safe.
 (LOW) The chef was selected as one of the bottom entries in the Elimination Challenge, but was not eliminated.
 (OUT) The chef lost the Elimination Challenge.

Episodes

References
Notes

Footnotes

External links
 Official website

Top Chef
2008 American television seasons
2009 American television seasons
Television shows set in New York City
Television shows filmed in New York (state)
Television shows filmed in Louisiana